Oravské Beskydy is a range of mountains straddling the northern-Slovakia-southern-Poland border, considered part of the Central Beskids, within the Outer Western Carpathians.

The highest mountain of the range is Babia Góra, the center of the Babia Góra National Park, one of the first biosphere reserves established worldwide.

References

Mountain ranges of Poland
Mountain ranges of Slovakia
Mountain ranges of the Western Carpathians